Special ID is a 2013 Chinese action film directed by Clarence Fok and starring Donnie Yen.

Plot
Yen takes on the role of Dragon Chan, a Hong Kong undercover police officer deep within the ranks of one of China’s most ruthless underworld gangs. The leader of the gang, Hung (Collin Chou), has made it his priority to weed out the government infiltrators in his midst. Struggling to keep his family together and his identity concealed, Chan is torn between two worlds.

Upping the stakes, as Chan’s undercover comrades are being dealt with, one by one, Chan fears his days are numbered. Now, he must risk everything to take down the organization and reclaim the life he lost when he took on this perilous assignment. As the action mounts, Chan must do everything he can to protect the SPECIAL IDENTITY he wishes he never had before it’s too late.

Cast
Donnie Yen as Dragon Chan
Jing Tian as Fang Jing
Andy On as Sunny
Zhang Hanyu as Blade
Ronald Cheng as Captain Cheung
Collin Chou as Hung
Paw Hee-ching as Sister Amy, Chan's mother
Yang Zhigang as Captain Lei Peng
Rain Lau as Mary
Ken Lo as Brother Bao
Frankie Ng as Mahjong player
Qi Daji
Terence Yin as Sunny's assistant
Evergreen Mak Cheung-ching as Brother Kun

Critical response
At Metacritic, which assigns a rating out of 100 to reviews from mainstream critics, the film has received an average score of 46, based on 6 reviews indicating "mixed or average reviews".

Andrew Chan of the Film Critics Circle of Australia writes, "The good news is that “Special ID” remains largely entertaining for most of the duration, but in many ways it remains a huge pile of mess."

Accolades

References

External links
 

2013 films
Chinese crime action films
2013 crime action films
Mixed martial arts films
Police detective films
Triad films
2010s Cantonese-language films
Films directed by Clarence Fok
Films set in Hong Kong
Films shot in Hong Kong
2010s Mandarin-language films
2010s Hong Kong films